The European Climate, Environment and Infrastructure Executive Agency (CINEA) is the European Commission  agency which manages decarbonisation and sustainable growth. It is the successor organisation of the Innovation and Networks Executive Agency (INEA) (which superseded the Trans-European Transport Network Executive Agency (TEN-T Agency) in 2014). Established on 15 February 2021, with a budget of €50 billion for the 2021-2027 period, it started work on 1 April 2021 in order to implement parts of certain EU programmes. The Agency will have a key role in supporting the European Green Deal, with a focus on creating synergies to support a sustainable, connected, and decarbonised Europe.

Organisation 
On 1 April 2021, the European Climate, Infrastructure and Environment Executive Agency (CINEA) officially started its operations.

As the successor of the Innovation and Networks Executive Agency (INEA), and merging programmes and staff from the Executive Agency for Small and Medium-sized Enterprises (EASME), the Agency continues to manage ongoing projects, while being entrusted with the management of new EU programmes worth over €50 billion for the 2021-2027 period delivering on the necessary actions to achieve climate neutrality in Europe by 2050:
 Innovation Fund
 Connecting Europe Facility: CEF Transport (including military mobility and the Cohesion Fund contribution) and CEF Energy
 Horizon Europe Pillar II, cluster 5: climate, energy and transport
 LIFE Programme: Nature and biodiversity; Circular economy and quality of life; Climate change mitigation and adaptation; Clean energy transition
 Renewable Energy Financing Mechanism
 Public sector loan facility, under the Just Transition Mechanism
 European Maritime, Fisheries and Aquaculture Fund (direct management) and compulsory contributions to Regional Fisheries Management Organisations (RFMOs) and other international organisations

The European Climate, Infrastructure and Environment Executive Agency is entrusted with a portfolio that gives it a clear focus as a climate and environment agency and a key role in supporting the European Green Deal.

Programmes 
For the Connecting Europe Facility (CEF), which supports the deployment of infrastructure across Europe, CINEA will continue to manage CEF Transport and Energy

CINEA will also continue to manage the implementation of the Innovation Fund, a key funding instrument supporting the European Commission's strategic vision of a climate neutral Europe by 2050.

Under the Horizon Europe programme, the new Agency will implement the Climate, Energy and Mobility cluster, thus adding Climate to its existing Horizon 2020 Energy and Transport portfolio.

CINEA will further expand its focus on environmental, nature conservation, climate action and clean energy projects as it takes over the implementation of the LIFE programme

The new Agency will also take on the European Maritime, Fisheries and Aquaculture Fund (EMFAF), which aims to better target public support to the Common Fisheries Policy, the Unions's Maritime Policy and the EU's agenda for international ocean governance.

CINEA will manage two new mechanisms contributing to renewable energy and climate neutrality.

 The Renewable Energy Financing Mechanism will support Member States in working more closely together towards individual and collective renewable energy targets.
 The Public Sector Loan Facility pillar of the Just Transition Mechanism is targeted at the regions most affected by the transition towards climate-neutrality.

For example it supports renewable heating and cooling in buildings.

Furthermore, one of the major events organised by the Commission on green energy is landing as well at CINEA: the European Sustainable Energy Week, the ideal platform to share ideas and knowhow, and forge alliances about an Energy Union.

CINEA will run between 2021 and 2027 with over 500 staff, and a budget of over €52 billion.

Other links 

 European Climate, Infrastructure and Environment Executive Agency (CINEA)
 LIFE Programme
 EU Sustainable Energy Week (EUSEW)
 European Green Deal
 Innovation and Networks Executive Agency (INEA)
 Agencies of the European Union

References 

Climate change and the environment
European Green Deal